Ji Kang (223–262), sometimes referred to as Xi Kang, courtesy name Shuye ("shu" means the 3rd son of the family, "ye" means night), was a Chinese writer, poet, Daoist philosopher, musician and alchemist of the Three Kingdoms period. He was one of the Seven Sages of the Bamboo Grove who held aloof from the dangerous politics of third-century China to devote themselves to art and refinement.

Ji Kang is noted as an author and was also a famous composer and guqin-player. He was described as a handsome and tall man (approximately 1.88 metres).

Life
As a thinker, Ji Kang wrote on longevity, music theory, politics and ethics. Among his works were Yangsheng Lun (飬生論, Essay on Nourishing Life), Shengwu Aile Lun (聲無哀樂論, Discourse on sounds [as] lacking sorrow or joy, i.e. On the Absence of Sentiments in Music), Qin Fu (琴賦, A Composition on the Qin), and Shisi Lun (釋私論, Discourse on Individuality). As a musician, Ji Kang composed a number of solo pieces for the qin. 

Ji Kang was highly critical of Confucianism and challenged many social conventions of his time, provoking scandal and suspicion. He married Cao Cao's granddaughter (or great-granddaughter according to some). Ji Kang assumed a post under the Cao Wei state, but official work bored him. When the regent Sima Zhao came to power, he offered Ji Kang a civil position, but Ji Kang insolently rejected Sima Zhao's envoy Zhong Hui. When one of Ji Kang's friends was imprisoned on false charges, Ji Kang testified in his defense, but both were sent to jail. At Zhong Hui's urging, Sima Zhao sentenced Ji Kang to death. Three thousand scholars petitioned for his pardon, but his enemies were implacable. Before his execution, Ji Kang is said to have played one last melody on the guqin, a swan song forever lost.

Ji Kang wrote Guangling San, a composition for the Guqin recounting the assassination of a king of Han. It was said to be inspired by a spirit visitation, and was widely acclaimed. He was also believed to have become a xian (Taoist immortal) through shijie by mainstream Taoism.

See also 
 List of Chinese authors

References

Further reading
Owen, Stephen [translator], Swartz, Wendy [translator], Tian, Xiaofei [editor], Warner, Ding Xiang [editor] (2017). The Poetry of Ruan Ji and Xi Kang .  De Gruyter Mouton.

External links
 Xi Kang Xi Kang and Qin music.

223 births
262 deaths
Three Kingdoms philosophers
3rd-century Chinese poets
Ancient music composers
Cao Wei musicians
Chinese male composers
Chinese non-fiction writers
Guqin players
Seven Sages of the Bamboo Grove
People from Huaibei
Writers from Anhui
Musicians from Anhui
Cao Wei essayists
Chinese composers